Dan Whannell (10 April 1899 – 22 July 1929) was a former Australian rules footballer who played with Carlton in the Victorian Football League (VFL).

Notes

External links 
		
Dan Whannell's profile at Blueseum

1899 births
1929 deaths
Australian rules footballers from Victoria (Australia)
Carlton Football Club players